Riga Free Port is a major port on the east coast of the Baltic Sea, located in Riga, the capital of Latvia. It stretched for 15 kilometers along both banks of the Daugava within the city limits, the area of the port is 1962 ha, water area - 6348 hectares. Navigation is carried out year-round. Most of the cargo turnover is made up of transit cargoes from and to CIS. The main objects of cargo handling are coal, oil products, timber, fertilizer and container cargoes. While the Ventspils Free Port and Liepaja Port specialize in export, a significant part of the activities of the Freeport of Riga is import. At the beginning of the 2000s, the goods arriving at the Riga port amounted to 70 percent of the incoming freight turnover of all the Latvian ports taken together.

In 2012, the Freeport of Riga took the 4th place in overall cargo turnover among the ports of the eastern Baltic (after Primorsk, St. Petersburg and Ust-Luga) and 3rd place in container freight turnover (after St. Petersburg and Klaipeda).

History 
Since its foundation, Riga was primarily a trading and transshipment point, so its development was directly related to maritime trade. The first harbor for settlement was the so-called Riga lake - the extension of the river Ridzene. In the 13th century, the city entered the Hanseatic League, and a large port grew on the Riga lake. The main export products at that time were furs, wood, wax, flax and hemp.

At the end of the 15th - the beginning of the 16th century the main port of the city moves to the Daugava. The basis of commodity turnover at this time are fabrics, metal, salt and fish. In the next century and a half the city passes successively into the hands of the Rzeczpospolita (1582), Sweden (1629) and Russian Empire (1721). In the Russian Empire, the port played an important role, at the beginning of the XX century occupying the third place among the ports of the state in terms of foreign trade and the first - in timber exports. In each of the world wars, the city fell into the German occupation - before that the port equipment was evacuated, and some buildings were destroyed. During the years of Soviet power the port expanded: the container terminal, built in the early 1980s on the island of Kundziņsala, at the time of commissioning was one of the largest in the USSR

With the adoption of Latvia's independence, the modern history of the port begins.

Port turnover

References

External links 
 Freeport of Riga website

Ports and harbours of Latvia
Port authorities